Jameh Mosque of Jajarm dates back to the 4 century AH and is located in Jajarm, inside the city.

References

Mosques in Iran
Mosque buildings with domes
National works of Iran